Agnes was a wooden carvel ketch built in 1877 at Williams River, Eagleton, near Newcastle, New South Wales, Australia. She was wrecked when she foundered off Jervis Bay, New South Wales, in 1883.

Shipwrecks of the Shoalhaven Region
Ships built in New South Wales
1877 ships
Maritime incidents in 1883
1871–1900 ships of Australia
Merchant ships of Australia
Ketches of Australia